Old Welsh is the stage of the Welsh language from about 800 AD until the early 12th century when it developed into Middle Welsh.  The preceding period, from the time Welsh became distinct from Common Brittonic around 550, has been called "Primitive" or "Archaic Welsh".

Texts
The oldest surviving text entirely in Old Welsh is understood to be that on a gravestone now in Tywyn – the Cadfan Stone – thought to date from the 7th century, although more recent scholarship dates it in the 9th century. Some examples of medieval Welsh poems and prose additionally originate from this period, but are found in later manuscripts; Y Gododdin, for example, is preserved in Middle Welsh. A text in Latin and Old Welsh in the Lichfield Gospels called the "Surrexit Memorandum" is thought to have been written in the early 8th century but may be a copy of a text from the 6th or 7th centuries.

Surrexit Memorandum

Text
Words in bold are Latin, not Old Welsh.

Translation
Tudfwlch son of Llywyd and son-in-law of Tudri arose to claim the land of Telych, which was in the hand of Elgu son of Gelli and the tribe of Idwared. They disputed long about it; in the end they disjudge Tudri's son-in-law by law. The goodmen said to each other 'Let us make peace'. Elgu gave afterwards a horse, three cows, three cows newly calved, in order that there might not be hatred between them from the ruling afterwards till the Day of Judgement. Tudfwlch and his kin will not want it for ever and ever.

Features
The text shows many of the early spelling conventions of Welsh, when the basic Latin alphabet was used to represent the phonology of Old Welsh.
Initial mutations, a major feature of all Insular Celtic languages, as well as internal consonant changes, do not appear to have been represented orthographically at this point.
In some cases, the language used in the Memorandum has become obsolete, but other words are relatively unchanged in modern Welsh:

Page 141 (on which the text is written) also appears to hold more text written in Old Welsh below Latin, and a mysterious section where text appears to have been erased. No translations or transcripts have yet been offered for the text.

It is also unknown why the particular page was used for the glosses, as little or no text appears to have been added to any other of the Lichfield Gospels. It is possible that the page was chosen to conceal the later added information.

See also
 British Latin

References

External links

Old and Middle Welsh by David Willis, University of Cambridge

Languages attested from the 7th century
Welsh, 1
History of the Welsh language
Welsh language
Extinct languages of Europe